This is a list of the mammal species recorded in Malaysia. There are 313 mammal species in Malaysia, of which six are critically endangered, seventeen are endangered, twenty-eight are vulnerable, and one is near threatened. Every mammal in Malaysia belongs to the subclass Theria, and the infraclass Eutheria, as all are placental mammals. They are listed below by the order which they belong to.

The following tags are used to highlight each species' conservation status as assessed by the International Union for Conservation of Nature:

Proboscidea (elephants)

The elephants comprise three living species and are the largest living land animals.

Family: Elephantidae (elephants)
Genus: Elephas
Asian elephant, E. maximus

Sirenia (manatees and dugongs)

Sirenia is an order of fully aquatic, herbivorous mammals that inhabit rivers, estuaries, coastal marine waters, swamps, and marine wetlands. All four species are endangered.

Family: Dugongidae
Genus: Dugong
Dugong, D. dugon

Scandentia (treeshrews)

The treeshrews are small mammals native to the tropical forests of Southeast Asia. Although called treeshrews, they are not true shrews and are not all arboreal.
Family: Tupaiidae (treeshrews)
Genus: Dendrogale
Bornean smooth-tailed treeshrew, D. melanura 
Genus: Tupaia
Northern treeshrew, T. belangeri 
Striped treeshrew, T. dorsalis 
Common treeshrew, T. glis 
Slender treeshrew, T. gracilis 
Long-footed treeshrew, T. longipes 
Pygmy treeshrew, T. minor 
Mountain treeshrew, T. montana 
Painted treeshrew, T. picta 
Large treeshrew, T. tana 
Family: Ptilocercidae
Genus: Ptilocercus
Pen-tailed treeshrew, P. lowii

Dermoptera (colugos)

The two species of colugos make up the order Dermoptera. They are arboreal gliding mammals found in Southeast Asia.

Family: Cynocephalidae (flying lemurs)
Genus: Galeopterus
 Sunda flying lemur, G. variegatus

Primates

The order Primates contains humans and their closest relatives: lemurs, lorisoids, monkeys, and apes.
Suborder: Strepsirrhini
Infraorder: Lemuriformes
Superfamily: Lorisoidea
Family: Lorisidae
Genus: Nycticebus
Sunda slow loris, N. coucang 
Suborder: Haplorhini
Infraorder: Tarsiiformes
Family: Tarsiidae (tarsiers)
Genus: Cephalopachus
 Horsfield's tarsier, C. bancanus 
Infraorder: Simiiformes
Parvorder: Catarrhini
Superfamily: Cercopithecoidea
Family: Cercopithecidae (Old World monkeys)
Subfamily: Cercopithecinae
Genus: Macaca
Stump-tailed macaque, M. arctoides 
Crab-eating macaque, M. fascicularis 
 Southern pig-tailed macaque, M. nemestrina 
Subfamily: Colobinae
Genus: Nasalis
Proboscis monkey, N. larvatus 
Genus: Presbytis
 Raffles' banded langur, P. femoralis 
 White-faced surili, P. frontata 
 Hose's langur, P. hosei 
 Robinson's banded langur, P. robinsoni 
 Maroon leaf monkey, P. rubicunda 
 Saban grizzled langur, P. sabana 
 White-thighed surili, P. siamensis 
Genus: Trachypithecus
Dusky leaf monkey, T. obscurus 
 Silvery lutung, T. cristatus 
 Selangor silvered langur, T. selangorensis
Superfamily: Hominoidea
Family: Hylobatidae (gibbons)
Genus: Hylobates
 Agile gibbon, H. agilis 
 Lar gibbon, H. lar 
 Müller's gibbon, H. muelleri 
Genus: Symphalangus
 Siamang, S. syndactylus 
Family: Hominidae
Subfamily: Ponginae
Genus: Pongo
Bornean orangutan, P. pygmaeus

Rodentia (rodents)
Rodents make up the largest order of mammals, with over 40% of mammalian species. They have two incisors in the upper and lower jaw which grow continually and must be kept short by gnawing.
SubHystricognathi
Family: Hystricidae (Old World porcupines)
Genus: Atherurus
 Asiatic brush-tailed porcupine, A. macrourus 
Genus: Hystrix
Malayan porcupine, H. brachyura 
 Thick-spined porcupine, H. crassispinis 
Genus: Trichys
 Long-tailed porcupine, T. fasciculata 
SubSciurognathi
Family: Sciuridae (squirrels)
Subfamily: Ratufinae
Genus: Ratufa
 Cream-coloured giant squirrel, R. affinis 
 Black giant squirrel, R. bicolor 
Subfamily: Sciurinae
Tribe: Sciurini
Genus: Rheithrosciurus
 Tufted ground squirrel, Rheithrosciurus macrotis
Tribe: Pteromyini
Genus: Aeromys
 Black flying squirrel, Aeromys tephromelas
 Thomas's flying squirrel, Aeromys thomasi'
Genus: Hylopetes Grey-cheeked flying squirrel, Hylopetes lepidus Red-cheeked flying squirrel, Hylopetes spadiceusGenus: Iomys Javanese flying squirrel, Iomys horsfieldiGenus: Petaurillus Lesser pygmy flying squirrel, Petaurillus emiliae Hose's pygmy flying squirrel, Petaurillus hosei Selangor pygmy flying squirrel, Petaurillus kinlochiiGenus: Petaurista Spotted giant flying squirrel, Petaurista elegans Red giant flying squirrel, Petaurista petauristaGenus: Petinomys Whiskered flying squirrel, Petinomys genibarbis Temminck's flying squirrel, Petinomys setosus Vordermann's flying squirrel, Petinomys vordermanniGenus: Pteromyscus Smoky flying squirrel, Pteromyscus pulverulentusSubfamily: Callosciurinae
Genus: Callosciurus Ear-spot squirrel, Callosciurus adamsi Kinabalu squirrel, Callosciurus baluensis Grey-bellied squirrel, Callosciurus caniceps Pallas's squirrel, Callosciurus erythraeus Black-striped squirrel, Callosciurus nigrovittatus Plantain squirrel, Callosciurus notatus Borneo black-banded squirrel, Callosciurus orestes Prevost's squirrel, Callosciurus prevostiiGenus: Dremomys Bornean mountain ground squirrel, Sundasciurus everetti Asian red-cheeked squirrel, Dremomys rufigenisGenus: Exilisciurus Least pygmy squirrel, Exilisciurus exilis Tufted pygmy squirrel, Exilisciurus whiteheadiGenus: Glyphotes Sculptor squirrel, Glyphotes simusGenus: Lariscus Four-striped ground squirrel, Lariscus hosei VU
 Three-striped ground squirrel, Lariscus insignisGenus: Nannosciurus Black-eared squirrel, Nannosciurus melanotisGenus: Rhinosciurus Shrew-faced squirrel, Rhinosciurus laticaudatusGenus: Sundasciurus Brooke's squirrel, Sundasciurus brookei Horse-tailed squirrel, Sundasciurus hippurus Jentink's squirrel, Sundasciurus jentinki VU
 Low's squirrel, Sundasciurus lowiiRobinson's squirrel, Sundasciurus robinsoniUpland squirrel, Sundasciurus tahan Slender squirrel, Sundasciurus tenuisGenus: Tamiops Himalayan striped squirrel, Tamiops macclellandiFamily: Spalacidae
Subfamily: Rhizomyinae
Genus: Rhizomys Hoary bamboo rat, Rhizomys pruinosus Large bamboo rat, Rhizomys sumatrensisFamily: Muridae (mice, rats, voles, gerbils, hamsters)
Subfamily: Murinae
Genus: Berylmys Bower's white-toothed rat, Berylmys bowersiGenus: Chiropodomys Indomalayan pencil-tailed tree mouse, Chiropodomys gliroides Large pencil-tailed tree mouse, Chiropodomys major Grey-bellied pencil-tailed tree mouse, Chiropodomys muroides Small pencil-tailed tree mouse, Chiropodomys pusillusGenus: Haeromys Ranee mouse, Haeromys margarettae VU
 Lesser ranee mouse, Haeromys pusillus VU
Genus: Hapalomys Marmoset rat, Hapalomys longicaudatusGenus: Lenothrix Grey tree rat, Lenothrix canusGenus: Leopoldamys Edwards's long-tailed giant rat, Leopoldamys edwardsi Long-tailed giant rat, Leopoldamys sabanusGenus: Maxomys Mountain spiny rat, Maxomys alticola EN
 Small spiny rat, Maxomys baeodon DD
 Malayan mountain spiny rat, Maxomys inas Chestnut-bellied spiny rat, Maxomys ochraceiventer Rajah spiny rat, Maxomys rajah Red spiny rat, Maxomys surifer Whitehead's spiny rat, Maxomys whiteheadiGenus: Mus Ryukyu mouse, Mus caroliGenus: Niviventer Dark-tailed tree rat, Niviventer cremoriventer Chestnut white-bellied rat, Niviventer fulvescens Long-tailed mountain rat, Niviventer rapitGenus: Pithecheir Malayan tree rat, Pithecheir parvusGenus: RattusBrown rat, R. norvegicus  introduced
 Annandale's rat, Rattus annandalei Ricefield rat, Rattus argentiventer Summit rat, Rattus baluensis EN
 Timor rat, Rattus timorensis DD
 Malayan field rat, Rattus tiomanicusGenus: Sundamys Mountain giant Sunda rat, Sundamys infraluteus Müller's giant Sunda rat, Sundamys muelleriEulipotyphla (shrews, moles, and hedgehogs)

The "shrew-forms" are insectivorous mammals. The shrews and solenodons closely resemble mice while the moles are stout-bodied burrowers. The hedgehogs are easily recognised by their spines while gymnures look more like large rats.
Family: Erinaceidae (hedgehogs)
Subfamily: Galericinae
Genus: Echinosorex Moonrat, E. gymnura 
Genus: Hylomys Short-tailed gymnure, H. suillus 
Family: Soricidae (shrews)
Subfamily: Crocidurinae
Genus: Crocidura Grey shrew, C. attenuata 
 Southeast Asian shrew, C. fuliginosa 
 Malayan shrew, C. malayana 
 Sunda shrew, C. monticola 
Genus: Suncus Black shrew, S. ater 
 Etruscan shrew, S. etruscus 
 Bornean pygmy shrew, S. hosei 
 Malayan pygmy shrew, S. malayanus 
Asian house shrew, S. murinus 
Subfamily: Soricinae
Tribe: Nectogalini
Genus: Chimarrogale Malayan water shrew, C. hantu 
 Sunda water shrew, C. phaeura 
Family: Talpidae (moles)
Subfamily: Talpinae
Tribe: Talpini
Genus: Euroscaptor Malaysian mole, E. malayanaChiroptera (bats)

The bats' most distinguishing feature is that their forelimbs are developed as wings, making them the only mammals capable of flight. Bat species account for about 20% of all mammals.
Family: Pteropodidae (flying foxes, Old World fruit bats)
Subfamily: Pteropodinae
Genus: Aethalops Pygmy fruit bat, Aethalops alectoGenus: Balionycteris Spotted-winged fruit bat, Balionycteris maculataGenus: Chironax Black-capped fruit bat, Chironax melanocephalusGenus: CynopterusLesser short-nosed fruit bat, C. brachyotis 
 Horsfield's fruit bat, Cynopterus horsfieldi Greater short-nosed fruit bat, Cynopterus sphinxGenus: Dyacopterus Dayak fruit bat, Dyacopterus spadiceusGenus: Megaerops Tailless fruit bat, Megaerops ecaudatus White-collared fruit bat, Megaerops wetmoreiGenus: Penthetor Dusky fruit bat, Penthetor lucasiGenus: Pteropus Small flying fox, Pteropus hypomelanus Large flying fox, Pteropus vampyrusGenus: Rousettus Bare-backed rousette, Rousettus spinalatus VU
Subfamily: Macroglossinae
Genus: Eonycteris Greater dawn bat, Eonycteris major Lesser dawn bat, Eonycteris spelaeaGenus: Macroglossus Long-tongued nectar bat, Macroglossus minimus Long-tongued fruit bat, Macroglossus sobrinusFamily: Vespertilionidae
Subfamily: Kerivoulinae
Genus: Kerivoula Flores woolly bat, Kerivoula flora Hardwicke's woolly bat, Kerivoula hardwickii Small woolly bat, Kerivoula intermedia Least woolly bat, Kerivoula minuta Papillose woolly bat, Kerivoula papillosa Clear-winged woolly bat, Kerivoula pellucida Painted bat, Kerivoula picta Whitehead's woolly bat, Kerivoula whiteheadiGenus: Phoniscus Groove-toothed bat, Phoniscus atrox Peters's trumpet-eared bat, Phoniscus jagoriiSubfamily: Myotinae
Genus: Myotis Large-footed bat, Myotis adversusHodgson's bat, M. formosus 
 Gomantong myotis, Myotis gomantongensis DD
 Lesser large-footed bat, Myotis hasseltii 
 Horsfield's bat, Myotis horsfieldii 
 Pallid large-footed myotis, Myotis macrotarsus Burmese whiskered bat, Myotis montivagus Whiskered myotis, Myotis muricola 
Whiskered bat, M. mystacinus 
 Ridley's bat, Myotis ridleyi Himalayan whiskered bat, Myotis siligorensisSubfamily: Vespertilioninae
Genus: Arielulus Coppery pipistrelle, Arielulus cuprosus VU
 Social pipistrelle, Arielulus societatis DD
Genus: Falsistrellus Peters's pipistrelle, Falsistrellus petersiGenus: Glischropus Common thick-thumbed bat, Glischropus tylopusGenus: Hesperoptenus Blanford's bat, Hesperoptenus blanfordi False serotine bat, Hesperoptenus doriae EN
 Large false serotine, Hesperoptenus tomesiGenus: Hypsugo Brown pipistrelle, Hypsugo imbricatus Red-brown pipistrelle, Hypsugo kitcheneri Big-eared pipistrelle, Hypsugo macrotisGenus: NyctalusCommon noctule, N. noctula 
Genus: Philetor Rohu's bat, Philetor brachypterusGenus: Pipistrellus Kelaart's pipistrelle, Pipistrellus ceylonicus Java pipistrelle, Pipistrellus javanicus Narrow-winged pipistrelle, Pipistrellus stenopterusGenus: Scotophilus Lesser Asiatic yellow bat, Scotophilus kuhliiGenus: Tylonycteris Lesser bamboo bat, Tylonycteris pachypus Greater bamboo bat, Tylonycteris robustulaSubfamily: Murininae
Genus: Harpiocephalus Greater hairy-winged bat, Harpiocephalus mordaxGenus: Murina Bronze tube-nosed bat, Murina aenea Round-eared tube-nosed bat, Murina cyclotis Hutton's tube-nosed bat, Murina huttoni Gilded tube-nosed bat, Murina rozendaali Brown tube-nosed bat, Murina suillaSubfamily: Miniopterinae
Genus: Miniopterus Western bent-winged bat, Miniopterus magnater Intermediate long-fingered bat, Miniopterus medius Small bent-winged bat, Miniopterus pusillusCommon bent-wing bat, M. schreibersii 
Family: Molossidae
Genus: Chaerephon Northern free-tailed bat, Chaerephon johorensis Wrinkle-lipped free-tailed bat, Chaerephon plicataGenus: Cheiromeles Hairless bat, Cheiromeles torquatusGenus: Mops Malayan free-tailed bat, Mops mopsFamily: Emballonuridae
Genus: Emballonura Small Asian sheath-tailed bat, Emballonura alecto Lesser sheath-tailed bat, Emballonura monticolaGenus: Saccolaimus Naked-rumped pouched bat, Saccolaimus saccolaimusGenus: Taphozous Long-winged tomb bat, Taphozous longimanus Black-bearded tomb bat, Taphozous melanopogonFamily: Nycteridae
Genus: Nycteris Malayan slit-faced bat, Nycteris tragataFamily: Megadermatidae
Genus: Megaderma Greater false vampire bat, Megaderma lyra Lesser false vampire bat, Megaderma spasmaFamily: Rhinolophidae
Subfamily: Rhinolophinae
Genus: Rhinolophus Acuminate horseshoe bat, Rhinolophus acuminatus Intermediate horseshoe bat, Rhinolophus affinis Arcuate horseshoe bat, Rhinolophus arcuatus Bornean horseshoe bat, Rhinolophus borneensis Croslet horseshoe bat, Rhinolophus coelophyllus Convex horseshoe bat, Rhinolophus convexus Creagh's horseshoe bat, Rhinolophus creaghi Blyth's horseshoe bat, Rhinolophus lepidus Woolly horseshoe bat, Rhinolophus luctus Big-eared horseshoe bat, Rhinolophus macrotis Malayan horseshoe bat, Rhinolophus malayanus Marshall's horseshoe bat, Rhinolophus marshalli Smaller horseshoe bat, Rhinolophus megaphyllus Pearson's horseshoe bat, Rhinolophus pearsoni Large-eared horseshoe bat, Rhinolophus philippinensis Least horseshoe bat, Rhinolophus pusillus Lesser woolly horseshoe bat, Rhinolophus sedulus Shamel's horseshoe bat, Rhinolophus shameli Lesser brown horseshoe bat, Rhinolophus stheno Trefoil horseshoe bat, Rhinolophus trifoliatusSubfamily: Hipposiderinae
Genus: Aselliscus Stoliczka's trident bat, Aselliscus stoliczkanusGenus: Coelops East Asian tailless leaf-nosed bat, Coelops frithii Malayan tailless leaf-nosed bat, Coelops robinsoniGenus: Hipposideros Great roundleaf bat, Hipposideros armiger Dusky roundleaf bat, Hipposideros ater Bicolored roundleaf bat, Hipposideros bicolor Fawn leaf-nosed bat, Hipposideros cervinus Ashy roundleaf bat, Hipposideros cineraceus Cox's roundleaf bat, Hipposideros coxi VU
 Diadem roundleaf bat, Hipposideros diadema Borneo roundleaf bat, Hipposideros doriae DD
 Dayak roundleaf bat, Hipposideros dyacorum Cantor's roundleaf bat, Hipposideros galeritus Intermediate roundleaf bat, Hipposideros larvatus Large Asian roundleaf bat, Hipposideros lekaguli Shield-faced roundleaf bat, Hipposideros lylei Malayan roundleaf bat, Hipposideros nequam Pomona roundleaf bat, Hipposideros pomona Pratt's roundleaf bat, Hipposideros pratti Ridley's leaf-nosed bat, Hipposideros ridleyi VU

Pholidota (pangolins)

The order Pholidota comprises the eight species of pangolin. Pangolins are anteaters and have the powerful claws, elongated snout and long tongue seen in the other unrelated anteater species.

Family: Manidae
Genus: ManisSunda pangolin, M. javanica 

Cetacea (whales)

The order Cetacea includes whales, dolphins and porpoises. They are the mammals most fully adapted to aquatic life with a spindle-shaped nearly hairless body, protected by a thick layer of blubber, and forelimbs and tail modified to provide propulsion underwater.
SubMysticeti
Family: Balaenopteridae
Subfamily: Balaenopterinae
Genus: BalaenopteraCommon minke whale, B. acutorostrata 
 Antarctic minke whale, Balaenoptera bonaerensis DD
 Sei whale, Balaenoptera borealis EN
 Bryde's whale, Balaenoptera edeni DD
 Blue whale, Balaenoptera musculus EN
 Omura's whale, Balaenoptera omurai DD
 Fin whale, Balaenoptera physalus EN
Subfamily: Megapterinae
Genus: Megaptera Humpback whale, M. novaeangliae LC
SubOdontoceti
Superfamily: Platanistoidea
Family: Phocoenidae
Genus: Neophocaena Finless porpoise, Neophocaena phocaenoides DD
Family: Physeteridae
Genus: Physeter Sperm whale, Physeter macrocephalus VU
Family: Kogiidae
Genus: KogiaPygmy sperm whale, K. breviceps 
 Dwarf sperm whale, Kogia simaFamily: Ziphidae
Subfamily: Hyperoodontinae
Genus: Mesoplodon Blainville's beaked whale, Mesoplodon densirostris DD
 Ginkgo-toothed beaked whale, Mesoplodon ginkgodens DD
Genus: Ziphius Cuvier's beaked whale, Ziphius cavirostris DD
Family: Delphinidae (marine dolphins)
Genus: Steno Rough-toothed dolphin, Steno bredanensis DD
Genus: Sousa Indo-Pacific humpbacked dolphin, Sousa chinensis DD
Genus: Tursiops Indo-Pacific bottlenose dolphin, Tursiops aduncus DD
 Common bottlenose dolphin, Tursiops truncatus DD
Genus: Delphinus Long-beaked common dolphin, Delphinus capensis DD
Genus: Grampus Risso's dolphin, Grampus griseus DD
Genus: Peponocephala Melon-headed whale, Peponocephala electraGenus: Feresa Pygmy killer whale, Feresa attenuata DD
Genus: Globicephala Short-finned pilot whale, Globicephala macrorhynchus DD
Genus: Lagenodelphis Fraser's dolphin, Lagenodelphis hosei DD
Genus: OrcaellaIrrawaddy dolphin, O. brevirostris 
Genus: OrcinusOrca, O. orca 
Genus: Pseudorca False killer whale, Pseudorca crassidens DD
Genus: Stenella Pantropical spotted dolphin, Stenella attenuata Spinner dolphin, Stenella longirostris Striped dolphin, Stenella coeruleoalba LC

Carnivora (carnivorans)

There are over 260 species of carnivorans, the majority of which feed primarily on meat. They have a characteristic skull shape and dentition.
Feliformia
Family: Felidae (cats)
Subfamily: Felinae
Genus: CatopumaBay cat, C. badia 
Asian golden cat, C. temminckii 
Genus: PardofelisMarbled cat, P. marmorata 
Genus: PrionailurusLeopard cat, P. bengalensis 
Flat-headed cat, P. planiceps 
Subfamily: Pantherinae
Genus: NeofelisSunda clouded leopard, N. diardi 
Clouded leopard, N. nebulosa 
Genus: PantheraLeopard, P. pardus 
 Indochinese leopard, P. p. delacouri 
Tiger, P. tigris 
 Malayan tiger, P. t. tigris 
Family: Viverridae (civets, mongooses, etc.)
Subfamily: Paradoxurinae
Genus: ArctictisBinturong, A. binturong 
Genus: ArctogalidiaSmall-toothed palm civet, A. trivirgata 
Genus: PagumaMasked palm civet, P. larvata 
Genus: ParadoxurusAsian palm civet, P. hermaphroditus  
Subfamily: Hemigalinae
Genus: CynogaleOtter civet, C. bennettii 
Genus: DiplogaleHose's palm civet, D. hosei 
Genus: HemigalusBanded palm civet, H. derbyanus 
Subfamily: Prionodontinae
Genus: Prionodon Banded linsang, P. linsang 
Subfamily: Viverrinae
Genus: ViverraLarge-spotted civet, V. megaspila 
Malayan civet, V. tangalunga 
Large Indian civet, V. zibetha 
Genus: ViverriculaSmall Indian civet, V. indica 
Family: Herpestidae (mongooses)
Genus: UrvaShort-tailed mongoose, U. brachyura 
Javan mongoose, U. javanica  
Collared mongoose, U. semitorquata 
Crab-eating mongoose, U. urva 
Caniformia
Family: Canidae (dogs, foxes)
Genus: Cuon Dhole, C. alpinus 
Family: Ursidae (bears)
Genus: HelarctosSun bear, H. malayanus 
Family: Mustelidae (mustelids)
Genus: AonyxAsian small-clawed otter, A. cinereus 
Genus: LutraHairy-nosed otter, L. sumatrana 
Genus: LutrogaleSmooth-coated otter, L. perspicillata 
Genus: MartesYellow-throated marten, M. flavigula 
Genus: MelogaleBornean ferret-badger, M. everetti 
Genus: MustelaMalayan weasel, M. nudipes 
Genus: MydausSunda stink badger, M. javanensis 

Perissodactyla (odd-toed ungulates)

The odd-toed ungulates are browsing and grazing mammals. They are usually large to very large, and have relatively simple stomachs and a large middle toe.
Family: Tapiridae (tapirs)
Genus: Acrocodia Malayan tapir, A. indica 

Artiodactyla (even-toed ungulates)

The even-toed ungulates are ungulates whose weight is borne about equally by the third and fourth toes, rather than mostly or entirely by the third as in perissodactyls. There are about 220 artiodactyl species, including many that are of great economic importance to humans.
Family: Tragulidae
Genus: Tragulus Lesser mouse deer, T. javanicus 
 Napu, T. napu 
Family: Cervidae (deer)
Subfamily: Cervinae
Genus: RusaSambar deer, R. unicolor 
Subfamily: Muntiacinae
Genus: Muntiacus Bornean yellow muntjac, M. atherodes 
Indian muntjac, M. muntjak 
Family: Bovidae (cattle, antelope, sheep, goats)
Subfamily: Bovinae
Genus: BosGaur, B. gaurus 
 Banteng, B. javanicus 
Subfamily: Caprinae
Genus: CapricornisMainland serow, C. sumatraensis 
Family: Suidae (pigs)
Subfamily: Suinae
Genus: Sus Bornean bearded pig, S. barbatus 
Wild boar, S. scrofa 

 Extirpated 
The following species are locally extinct in the country:
Wild water buffalo, Bubalus arneeSumatran rhinoceros, Dicerorhinus sumatrensisJavan rhinoceros, Rhinoceros sondaicus''

See also
List of chordate orders
Lists of mammals by region
Mammal classification

References

External links

.
Mammals
Malaysia
 Malaysia
Malaysia